Poley is a village and a former municipality in the district of Salzlandkreis, in Saxony-Anhalt, Germany. Since 1 January 2010, it has  been part of the town of Bernburg.

History
As of January 1, 2005, the municipality of Poley belonged to the administrative community of Nienburg (Saale). On January 1, 2010, the previously independent municipality was incorporated into the city of Bernburg (Saale) together with the municipalities of Baalberge, Biendorf, Gröna, Peißen, Preußlitz and Wohlsdorf.

References 

Former municipalities in Saxony-Anhalt
Bernburg